The South Madison Avenue-Pannell Road Historic District in Monroe, Georgia is a  historic district which was listed on the National Register of Historic Places in 1983. The listing included eight contributing buildings.

The area developed as a small country hamlet, outside Monroe.  Most of the buildings were built before 1910.

References

Historic districts on the National Register of Historic Places in Georgia (U.S. state)
National Register of Historic Places in Walton County, Georgia